Challwayuq (Quechua challwa fish, -yuq a suffix, "the one with fish", also spelled Chalhuayoc) is a mountain in the Andes of Peru whose summit reaches about  above sea level. It is located in the Pasco Region, Daniel Alcides Carrión Province, Yanahuanca District. Challwayuq lies northwest of Yana Chaka.

References

Mountains of Peru
Mountains of Pasco Region